The 1993–94 Georgetown Hoyas men's basketball team represented Georgetown University in the 1993–94 NCAA Division I college basketball season. John Thompson, coached them in his 22nd season as head coach. They played their home games at USAir Arena in Landover, Maryland. They were members of the Big East Conference and finished the season with a record of 19-12, 10-8 in Big East play. Their record earned them a bye in the first round of the 1994 Big East men's basketball tournament, and they advanced to the tournament final before losing to Providence. They were awarded a No. 9 seed in the Midwest Region of the 1994 NCAA Division I men's basketball tournament – Georgetowns 15th NCAA Tournament appearance in 16 years – and advanced to the second round before losing to the regions No. 1 seed, Arkansas.

Season recap

Four different underclassmen had started at shooting guard for the Hoyas during the  previous season, and the lack of a reliable guard had hurt the Hoyas badly – so badly that their 14-year string of consecutive NCAA tournament appearances had finally come to an end, although they had made a run all the way to the final game of the 1993 National Invitation Tournament. To address the shooting guard issue, Thompson signed George Butler, who transferred from Tyler Junior College in Tyler, Texas, to play his junior year at Georgetown. With Butler on the team, Thompson changed Georgetowns offensive strategy from one of feeding the ball to a "big man" at center to an uptempo game by the teams guards, deemphasizing the role of sophomore centers Duane Spencer and Othella Harrington. In the season opener against Maryland, Butler scored 21 points and Harrington had 16 points and 15 rebounds, although Maryland won the game as freshman Terrapins forward Joe Smith debuted with a 26-point game.

Butler played in all 31 games and started 25 of them. He led the team in scoring in three of the first five games and in six games by mid-January 1994, and he scored in double figures 21 times, including a 26-point game against Boston College. For the season, he led the team in three-pointers and free throws and was second in scoring. Harrington, meanwhile, saw his performance decline under the new offensive scheme. Thompson started junior Don Reid at center during the first half of the season, relegating Spencer to the bench and moving Harrington to power forward. Harringtons reflexes tended to be too slow for the new uptempo offense, and his tendency to put the ball on the floor after receiving an inside pass instead of taking the ball straight to the basket also hindered him. By mid-January 1994, Harrington had led the team in scoring in only one game, and his scoring had dropped by 25 percent from the previous season, despite averaging over 30 minutes per game. However, Thompson then moved Harrington back to center, and his play improved. He scored in double figures in 14 of the last 15 games of the season, including a 27-point game against Syracuse, had 17-rebound efforts in two consecutive games, and scored a career-high 31 points at Madison Square Garden against St. John's in an important win in Georgetowns push to return to the NCAA Tournament. He finished as the team leader in scoring and rebounds.

Reid's first two seasons at Georgetown had been unimpressive; he had averaged 1.6 points per game in each of them with limited playing time. Starting at center during the first half of this season while Harrington played power forward, he finally began to excel. He had 11 points and 10 rebounds against Memphis State and a season-high 15 points and 11 rebounds in a game with Villanova. He rebounded in double digits five times, and he averaged 7.7 points and 5.9 rebounds per game for the year.

Senior point guard and second-year team captain Joey Brown played in 30 games and started 29 of them, scoring in double figures 17 times. He had four double-doubles (double figures in scoring and assists), giving him a career total of six, and in the win over Nevada-Las Vegas he became the first Georgetown player to have 1,000 points, 400 rebounds, and 500 assists in his career. He led the team in assists in all but four games and averaged 10.0 points per game.

Senior forward Robert Churchwell scored in double figures 15 times. His best performances were a 24-point game against Nevada-Las Vegas and 19 against Boston College, and he averaged 9.7 points per game.

The Hoyas received a bye in the first round of the 1994 Big East tournament, and  defeated Boston College handily in the quarterfinals. Butler scored 24 points in an overtime win over Seton Hall in the semifinals and 18 points against Providence in the final before fouling out with 11:09 left in the game. With him out, the Hoyas had to rely on inexperienced guards for the rest of the game, and Providence took advantage of that to beat Georgetown for the tournament championship.

Georgetown returned to the NCAA tournament, its 15th appearance in the last 16 seasons, seeded ninth in the Midwest Region. The Hoyas upset No. 8 seed Illinois in the first round, with Butler scoring nine points in the first half and 18 in the second half for a career-high 27 points and Reid putting in a 15-point, seven-rebound effort. Two days later, the Hoyas lost to the regions No. 1 seed, Arkansas, the fourth straight time that Georgetown had exited the NCAA Tournament in the second round.

Georgetowns season opener against Maryland was the first meeting of the teams outside of a tournament since a December 5, 1979, game in which John Thompson and Maryland head coach Lefty Driesell had gotten into a shouting match at midcourt. The incident apparently had soured relations between the schools, which had a lengthy history of regular-season meetings before the 1979 game. The 1993 meeting raised hopes that the teams would resume regular meetings, but they did not schedule one another for a non-tournament regular-season game again until 2015.

DePauls January 22, 1994, victory over Georgetown was the last time the Blue Demons defeated the Hoyas for 20 years. The following season, Georgetown would begin a 14-game winning streak against DePaul which the Blue Demons would not finally break until they upset the Hoyas in the first round of the 2014 Big East tournament in March 2014.

Roster
Source

Rankings

Source

1993–94 Schedule and results
Sources
 All times are Eastern

|-
!colspan=9 style="background:#002147; color:#8D817B;"| Regular Season

|-
!colspan=9 style="background:#002147; color:#8D817B;"| Big East tournament

|-
!colspan=9 style="background:#002147; color:#8D817B;"| NCAA tournament

Notes

References

Georgetown Hoyas men's basketball seasons
Georgetown Hoyas
Georgetown
Georgetown Hoyas men's basketball team
Georgetown Hoyas men's basketball team